Monoxenus declivis is a species of beetle in the family Cerambycidae. It was described by Hintz in 1911. It is known from Uganda.

References

Endemic fauna of Uganda
declivis
Beetles described in 1911